The Ronkonkoma Branch is a rail service operated by the Long Island Rail Road (LIRR) in the U.S. state of New York. On LIRR maps and printed schedules, the "Ronkonkoma Branch" includes trains running along the railroad's Main Line from Hicksville (where the Port Jefferson Branch leaves the Main Line) to Ronkonkoma, and between Ronkonkoma and the Main Line's eastern terminus at Greenport. The section of the Main Line east of Ronkonkoma is not electrified and is referred to as the Greenport Branch.

The western segment between Hicksville and Ronkonkoma sees 24-hour service to Penn Station in New York City. The eastern segment between Ronkonkoma and Greenport is served by diesel-electric trains, and only sees a handful of trips each day. The eastern segment is also the only dark territory area of the Long Island Rail Road, meaning that it does not have signals.

Segments

Hicksville to Ronkonkoma

The western segment of the line from Hicksville to Ronkonkoma was electrified in 1987, creating a one-seat ride to Penn Station. Formerly, service on this segment was provided by diesel trains, which could not enter Penn Station, requiring a transfer. Average rush-hour trip time from Ronkonkoma to Penn Station decreased from 97 minutes pre-electrification (including the mandatory transfer from a diesel to an electric train) to 71 minutes afterwards.

The $168.5 million project attracted many new passengers. A survey of peak-hour Ronkonkoma Branch passengers conducted by the LIRR in April 1988 found that 42 percent of the branch's passengers were new to the line: 34 percent switched from other lines (the Port Jefferson and Montauk Branches), 6 percent were new to the LIRR as a whole and 2 percent recently returned to the LIRR. By September 1988, over 2,000 new riders during the morning rush hour had switched to the Ronkonkoma Branch, much of which occurred in the first month after electrification, faster than the LIRR expected. Commuters complained that the expanded parking facilities at Ronkonkoma built in anticipation of electrification were overcrowded and already inadequate, and that double-parking and vandalism were rampant.

In the decades since, the amount of parking at Ronkonkoma has expanded. In 2012, the Metropolitan Transportation Authority (MTA) started adding a second track to the line between Farmingdale and Ronkonkoma to increase capacity. The project was ultimately completed in 2018.

Greenport Branch
The relatively small amount of train movements on this segment are governed by train orders and timetable authority. This segment is served by diesel-electric "scoots", most of which terminate at Ronkonkoma, requiring customers traveling west of Ronkonkoma to transfer there. Three eastbound and four westbound scoots travel each weekday between Ronkonkoma and Greenport. Also, one additional round trip is scheduled between Ronkonkoma and Riverhead (formerly ) each weekday. Weekend service consists of four round-trips each day between Ronkonkoma and Greenport. Added in summer 2016, this is the only Greenport scoot trip to serve the New York City terminals.

The Greenport Branch has by far the lowest ridership among LIRR services for which data is available. In 2018, the LIRR's second–least used service (the West Hempstead Branch) had more than 14 times as many riders as the Greenport Branch did; in the same year, Greenport Branch riders accounted for 0.08% of LIRR ridership overall. The LIRR has cited these ridership trends in attempts to end service east of Ronkonkoma. In 2010, the idea was entertained by the financially troubled MTA, who proposed eliminating all scoot service except for the popular summer weekend service. Ultimately, weekday service remained, but weekend service outside of the summer season (defined as Memorial Day-Columbus Day) was discontinued. In 2013, the span of weekend service was extended to operate from the first weekend in May to the last weekend in November. In 2016, the LIRR restored year-long weekend service between Ronkonkoma and Greenport.

Central Branch
Some LIRR maps also include as part of the Ronkonkoma Branch the non-electrified Central Branch, which splits from the Ronkonkoma Branch east of Bethpage and connects with the more southern Montauk Branch, just west of Babylon. There are no stations along this stretch, and it is mainly used by trains with diesel-electric engines going express from Jamaica to Babylon. No trains using this track appear on Ronkonkoma Branch schedules; they appear on Montauk Branch and Babylon Branch schedules, and some appear on schedules for Mineola and Hicksville on the Main Line, if a stop is scheduled there.

History and current projects

Greenport enhancements
Despite proposing to eliminate most service east of Ronkonkoma, the MTA is enhancing the segment's infrastructure. The LIRR is required to install a positive train control signaling system on all its trackage by the end of 2018. The MTA initially budgeted $29 million in its 2015–2019 capital program to add signals along the 10 mile segment from Ronkonkoma to Yaphank. This upgrade would install signals, track circuits and automatic speed control (ASC). However, in a 2017 amendment of the capital program, the agency postponed the construction of the new signal system, only including $2 million to fund design. After positive train control was activated on the easternmost portion of the Montauk Branch in November 2017, the Greenport Branch became the only portion of the LIRR that lacked positive train control.

In its 2015–2034 20-Year Capital Needs Assessment, the MTA describes extending electrification eastward from Ronkonkoma to Yaphank or Riverhead, as well as the addition of a second track between Ronkonkoma and Yaphank as long-term needs. However, the MTA cites the high cost of electrification and other components as a barrier to present-day action. If electrification were to be extended eastward, stations would also need upgrading, since all station platforms east of Ronkonkoma are only long enough to fit one-and-a-half train cars.

Stations

References

Long Island Rail Road branches
Transportation in Nassau County, New York
Transportation in Suffolk County, New York